Schleicher Electronic GmbH und Co. KG is a German technology company based in Berlin.

The company develops and produces control systems (CNC) used in automation engineering. In addition, Schleicher Electronic also works in the field of functional safety engineering.

Schleicher Electronic collaborates with internationally known research facilities, such as the Fraunhofer Institutes and the Technische Universität Berlin. The company is also a member of SERCOS International e.V. – an open, real-time interface for drives.

History 

The company was founded as “Schleicher Relais Werke” by Otto Schleicher in 1937. In 1958, “Schleicher Relais Werke” presented the MZ 54 time-delay relay at the first industrial trade fair in Hannover. It was the first multifunctional time-delay relay, and due to its purely electromechanical basis, is still used in many ways. Electromechanical (and later electronic) time-delay relays made “Schleicher Relais Werke” internationally known.

In 1976, Schleicher developed and marketed a programmable controller (PLC). In collaboration with the Fraunhofer Institute, Schleicher developed a numerical control (NC) kernel in 1983. They are one of the few CNC manufacturers with their own software kernel.

In 1986, the company received the Berlin-Brandenburg Innovation Prize for an “Online Curve Interpolator” for generating free-form curves (in NC machines). In 1988, the Promodul-U CNC-RC-PLC system was introduced, and safety control devices were introduced to the market in 1989. In 1995, production was changed from assembly-belt production to group-workstations, a very new concept at the time. Starting in 2003, Schleicher Electronic was acquired by Wieland Group. Wieland incorporated Schleicher into the parent company in certain product areas and discontinued a series of product developments. At that time, Schleicher was mainly a production and development company and dependent on the sales department of Wieland, until they were sold to Aurelius AG in 2007. After reorganisation, the expansion of the sales department and establishment in the Asian market, Aurelius AG sold the company in the summer of 2013 to entrepreneur Sven Dübbers.

Chronology 

 1937: Company founded by Otto Schleicher in Berlin as "Schleicher Relais Werke".
 1958: Development of the first multifunctional time-delay relay – a.k.a. time relay - in the world. Renamed ‘Schleicher Relaisbau KG’.
 1959: Market share of 33 percent was achieved in West Germany in special relays and special productions.
 1971: Development of integrated plastic mechanisms for relays - from 260 individual parts to 80 precision parts. Moved to the current site in the Berlin district of Spandau.
 1974: Changed name to ‘Schleicher GmbH & Co. Relais-Werke KG’.
 1976: Developed and marketed the first programmable controller.
 1983: Acquisition of the NC kernel from the Fraunhofer institute.
 1984: Gesellschaft für technische Datenverarbeitungssysteme mbH (GEDAS) was founded together with Volkswagen.
 1985: Development of production robots, amongst other things, for the automotive industry
 1986: The company received the Berlin-Brandenburg Innovation Prize for an ‘Online Curve Interpolator’, a software development for complex curve programming.
 1988: Schleicher linked PLC and CNC functionalities in a common data structure: the Promudul-U control system.
 1989: Portfolio expanded to include safety relay devices.
 1995: Converted from assembly-belt production to group-workstations; at the time a very new concept.
 1997: RIO I/O system using microLine field bus SPS.
 2000: PC-based control technology - ProNumeric linked sensor technology and the Internet.
 2002: Start of XCx control line using Ethernet interface.
 2003: Schleicher became part of the Wieland Electric Group and was given its current name ‘Schleicher Electronic GmbH & Co. KG’. Market introduction of safety control devices.
 2004: Expansion of the XCx line.
 2005: Supplied the environmental-technology market segment.
 2007: The Aurelius AG group of companies took over Schleicher Electronic, restructured the company and started to access new markets, mainly in Asia.
 2009: Schleicher presented "mocap": intuitive robot teaching that does not require programming knowledge.
 2010: High-speed laser control using the newly developed XSL module.
 2013: Entrepreneur Sven Dübbers (Hamburg) bought Schleicher Electronic from Aurelius AG. Expansion of the product portfolio to include EES (Electronic Engineering Services) and EMS (Electronic Manufacturing Services).

Products

Industrial control and automation technology 

 Programmable controllers (PLC), including integrated ones
 Computerised numerical control (CNC) controllers
 Human machine interface (HMI) (operating devices, visualisation)
 Software (programming tools, implementation and diagnostic tools, simulation)
 Decentralised input/output systems (I/O systems)
 Electronic actuator technology
 Customised controls/control systems for a wide range of industries

Customised controls 

 Implementation of product ideas
 Drafting of specifications/functional requirements
 Development/construction of hardware and software
 Certification and licences
 Production of prototypes and preproduction series
 Logistics and material management
 Production of SMDs (surface-mounted devices) and THT (through-hole technology)
 Testing using modern test systems
 Documentation of all production stages
 Assembly of devices and components
 Packing and shipping
 Repair services and after-sales service
 Life-cycle management

Relays 

 Safety relays
sno 2001-24 scheleicher
Nr.18810269 716

Electronic Engineering Services (EES) – Development services 

 Implementation of product ideas
 Drafting specifications and functional requirements
 Development/construction of hardware and software
 Certification and licenses
 Production of prototypes and pre-production series
 Electronic products for automation, communication, harsh environmental conditions, etc.

Electronic Manufacturing Service (EMS) – Production services 

 Production of prototypes
 Logistics and material management
 Production of SMD and THT
 Testing using modern test systems
 Documentation of all production stages
 Assembly of devices and modules
 Packaging and shipping
 Repair services and after-sales services
 Life-cycle management

External links 
 Website of Schleicher Electronic

References 

Manufacturing companies based in Berlin
Electrical engineering companies of Germany